Muna Hotel is a hotel in Mogadishu, Somalia. The hotel, located less than a mile from Somalia's presidential palace, is a noted conference centre and is regularly used for meetings between government officials and important persons.

History
In 2010 it was the centre of a suicide attack, killing several members of the Somali Parliament amidst the fighting that began on 23 August.

Architecture
The hotel is located on a street corner and is housed in a three-story building. The building is painted in mint and pink and has grey shutters. The two balconies jut out from the building and are painted pink. The logo for Muna Hotel on the side of the hotel is painted in blue and white. The hotel name is given in French as "Hotel Muna" and then in Arabic underneath.

See also
Muna Hotel attack

References

External links
Photograph
Buildings and structures in Mogadishu
Hotels in Somalia